Marrs Hill Township (formerly Mars Hill, Mar Hill, and Marr's Hill) is one of thirty-seven townships in Washington County, Arkansas, USA. As of the 2000 census, its total population was 898.

Geography

Cities, towns, villages
Jabur (historical)
Rickert (historical)
Viney Grove

Cemeteries
The township contains Bell Cemetery and Rose Cemetery.

Major routes
The township contains no state highways.

References

United States Census Bureau 2008 TIGER/Line Shapefiles

External links
 US-Counties.com
 City-Data.com

Townships in Washington County, Arkansas
Populated places established in 1850
Townships in Arkansas